The 4th Golden Horse Awards (Mandarin:第4屆金馬獎) took place on October 30, 1966, at Zhongshan Hall in Taipei, Taiwan.

Winners and nominees 
Winners are listed first, highlighted in boldface.

References

4th
1966 film awards
1966 in Taiwan